Sarah Porter Hillhouse (1763—March 26, 1831) was Georgia's, and possibly America's, first woman editor and printer. She has been posthumously inducted into both the Georgia Newspaper Hall of Fame and the Georgia Women of Achievement.

Life 
In 1786, Sarah joined her husband in moving to Washington, Georgia from Massachusetts.

In 1814, she built her house that is now a historic site in Washington.

Monitor 
In 1801, Sarah's husband David Hillhouse purchased the town's newspaper, the Washington Gazette, and renamed it the Monitor. When he died just two years later, Sarah took over the role as publisher, making her the first woman publisher in Georgia.

References 

1763 births
1831 deaths
19th-century American newspaper publishers (people)
19th-century American businesswomen
19th-century American businesspeople